Hibiscus is a genus of flowering plants in the mallow family, Malvaceae. The genus is quite large, comprising several hundred species that are native to warm temperate, subtropical and tropical regions throughout the world. Member species are renowned for their large, showy flowers and those species are commonly known simply as "hibiscus", or less widely known as rose mallow. Other names include hardy hibiscus, rose of sharon, and tropical hibiscus.

The genus includes both annual and perennial herbaceous plants, as well as woody shrubs and small trees. The generic name is derived from the Greek name ἰβίσκος (ibískos) which Pedanius Dioscorides gave to Althaea officinalis ( 40–90 AD).

Several species are widely cultivated as ornamental plants, notably Hibiscus syriacus and Hibiscus rosa-sinensis.

A tea made from hibiscus flowers is known by many names around the world and is served both hot and cold. The beverage is known for its red colour, tart flavour, and vitamin C content.

Description 
The leaves are alternate, ovate to lanceolate, often with a toothed or lobed margin (dentate). The flowers are large, conspicuous, trumpet-shaped, with five or more petals, colour from white to pink, red, blue, orange, peach, yellow or purple, and from 4–18 cm broad.

Flower colour in certain species, such as H. mutabilis and H. tiliaceus, changes with age. The fruit is a dry five-lobed capsule, containing several seeds in each lobe, which are released when the capsule dehisces (splits open) at maturity. It is of red and white colours. It is an example of complete flowers.

Species 

In temperate zones, probably the most commonly grown ornamental species is Hibiscus syriacus, the common garden hibiscus, also known in some areas as the "rose of Althea" or "rose of Sharon" (but not to be confused with the unrelated Hypericum calycinum, also called "rose of Sharon"). In tropical and subtropical areas, the Chinese hibiscus (H. rosa-sinensis), with its many showy hybrids, is the most popular hibiscus.

Several hundred species are known, including:

Hibiscus abelmoschus L. synonym of Abelmoschus moschatus Medik.
Hibiscus abelmoschus var. betulifolius Mast. synonym of Abelmoschus moschatus Medik.
Hibiscus abelmoschus var. genuinus Hochr. synonym of Abelmoschus moschatus Medik.
Hibiscus laevis abutiloides Willd. synonym of Talipariti tiliaceum var. pernambucense (Arruda) Fryxell
Hibiscus abyssinicus Steud. (unresolved)
Hibiscus acapulcensis Fryxell
Hibiscus acerifolius Salisb. (unresolved)
Hibiscus acerifolius DC. (unresolved)
Hibiscus acetosaefolius DC. (unresolved)
Hibiscus acetosella Welw. ex Hiern. false roselle
Hibiscus acicularis
Hibiscus aculeatus—comfortroot
Hibiscus aethiopicus L.
Hibiscus altissimus
Hibiscus andongensis
Hibiscus angolensis
Hibiscus aponeurus
Hibiscus archeri—Archer's hibiscus
Hibiscus aridicola
Hibiscus arnottianus A.Gray—kokiʻo ʻula (Hawaii)
Hibiscus asper—bush roselle
Hibiscus austroyunnanensis
Hibiscus barbosae
Hibiscus benguellensis
Hibiscus berberidifolius
Hibiscus bernieri
Hibiscus bifurcatus—fork-bracted rosemallow
Hibiscus biseptus—Arizona rosemallow
Hibiscus bojerianus
Hibiscus boryanus—foulsapate marron
Hibiscus brackenridgei A.Gray—Hawaiian hibiscus maʻo hau hele
Hibiscus burtt-davyi
Hibiscus caerulescens
Hibiscus caesius—dark-eyed hibiscus (South Africa)
Hibiscus calyphyllus—lemonyellow rosemallow (tropical Africa)
Hibiscus cameronii—Cameron's hibiscus, pink hibiscus
Hibiscus cannabinus L.—Kenaf
Hibiscus castroi
Hibiscus cisplatinus—rosa del rio
Hibiscus citrinus
Hibiscus clayi O.Deg. & I.Deg.— Hawaiian red hibiscus (Hawaii)
Hibiscus clypeatus—Congo mahoe
Hibiscus coccineus (Medik.) Walter—scarlet rosemallow
Hibiscus colimensis
Hibiscus columnaris—mahot rempart
Hibiscus comoensis
Hibiscus congestiflorus
Hibiscus costatus
Hibiscus coulteri—desert rosemallow
Hibiscus cuanzensis
Hibiscus dasycalyx—Neches River rosemallow
Hibiscus denudatus Benth.—pale face (Southwestern United States, Northwestern Mexico)
Hibiscus dimidiatus
Hibiscus dioscorides  (Yemen)
Hibiscus diplocrater
Hibiscus diriffan A.G.Mill. (Yemen)
Hibiscus diversifolius—swamp hibiscus
Hibiscus dongolensis
Hibiscus donianus
Hibiscus elatus—mahoe
Hibiscus elegans
Hibiscus engleri—wild hibiscus
Hibiscus escobariae
Hibiscus excellii
Hibiscus ferrugineus
Hibiscus ficalhoanus
Hibiscus flavoroseus
Hibiscus fragilis DC.—mandrinette (Mascarene Islands)
Hibiscus fragrans
Hibiscus fritzscheae
Hibiscus fugosioides
Hibiscus furcellatus Desr.—lindenleaf rosemallow (Caribbean, Florida, Central America, South America, Hawaii)
Hibiscus fuscus
Hibiscus genevii Bojer (Mauritius)
Hibiscus gilletii
Hibiscus gossweileri
Hibiscus grandidieri
Hibiscus grandiflorus Michx.—swamp rosemallow (Southeastern United States)
Hibiscus grandistipulatus
Hibiscus grewiifolius
Hibiscus hamabo
Hibiscus hastatus
Hibiscus heterophyllus—native rosella
Hibiscus hirtus—lesser mallow
Hibiscus hispidissimus
Hibiscus huellensis
Hibiscus hybridus
Hibiscus indicus
Hibiscus insularis Endl.—Phillip Island hibiscus (Phillip Island)
Hibiscus integrifolius
Hibiscus jaliscensis
Hibiscus kochii
Hibiscus kokio—red rosemallow
Hibiscus labordei
Hibiscus laevis All. (=H. militaris)—halberd-leaved rosemallow (central and eastern North America)
Hibiscus lasiocarpos—woolly rosemallow
Hibiscus lasiococcus
Hibiscus lavaterioides
Hibiscus laxiflorus
Hibiscus leptocladus ([Northwest Australia])
Hibiscus leviseminus
Hibiscus lilacinus—lilac hibiscus
Hibiscus liliiflorus—Rodrigues tree hibiscus
Hibiscus longifolius
Hibiscus longisepalus
Hibiscus ludwigii
Hibiscus lunariifolius
Hibiscus macilwraithensis - Australia
Hibiscus macrogonus
Hibiscus macrophyllus—largeleaf rosemallow
Hibiscus macropodus
Hibiscus makinoi—Okinawan hibiscus
Hibiscus malacophyllus Balf.f. (Yemen)
Hibiscus malacospermus
Hibiscus martianus— heartleaf rosemallow
Hibiscus mesnyi Pierre ex Laness. (Vietnam endemic)
Hibiscus moscheutos L.—crimsoneyed rosemallow (Central and Eastern North America)
Hibiscus mutabilis L.—cotton rosemallow, Confederate rose (East Asia)
Hibiscus paramutabilis
Hibiscus pedunculatus
Hibiscus phoeniceus—Brazilian rosemallow
Hibiscus platanifolius
Hibiscus pusillus Thunb. -bladderweed
Hibiscus quattenensis
Hibiscus poeppigii—Poeppig's rosemallow
Hibiscus radiatus—monarch rosemallow
Hibiscus rosa-sinensis L.—Chinese hibiscus (East Asia)
Hibiscus sabdariffa L.—roselle, omutete, or sorrel
Hibiscus schizopetalus—fringed rosemallow
Hibiscus scottii
Hibiscus socotranus
Hibiscus sinosyriacus
Hibiscus splendens
Hibiscus stenanthus Balf.f. (Yemen)
Hibiscus striatus—striped rosemallow
Hibiscus sturtii AustraliaHibiscus syriacus L. (type species)—rose of Sharon (Asia)Hibiscus taiwanensis S.Y. HuHibiscus tiliaceus L.—sea hibiscus (Australia, Southeast Asia, Oceania)Hibiscus tozerensis - AustraliaHibiscus trilobus—threelobe rosemallowHibiscus trionum L.—flower-of-an-hourHibiscus vitifolius—tropical rose mallowHibiscus waimeae A.Heller—kokiʻo keʻokeʻo (Hawaii)

 Formerly placed in the genus Abelmoschus esculentus (L.) Moench (as H. esculentus L.)Abelmoschus ficulneus (L.) Wight & Arn. (as H. ficulneus L.)
Abelmoschus manihot subsp. manihot (as H.  manihot L.)
Abelmoschus manihot var. pungens (Roxb.) Hochr. (as H. pungens Roxb.)
Abelmoschus manihot var. tetraphyllus (Roxb. ex Hornem.) Borss. Waalk. (as H. tetraphyllus Roxb. ex Hornem.)
Abelmoschus moschatus subsp. moschatus (as H. abelmoschus L.)
Abelmoschus moschatus subsp. tuberosus (Span.) Borss. Waalk. (as H.  sagittifolius Kurz)Alyogyne cuneiformis (DC.) Lewton (as H. cuneiformis DC.)Alyogyne hakeifolia (Giord.) Alef. (as H. hakeifolius Giord.)Alyogyne huegelii (Endl.) Fryxell (as H. wrayae Lindl.)Alyogyne pinoniana (Gaudich.) Fryxell (as H. pinonianus Gaudich.)Firmiana simplex (L.) W.Wight (as H. simplex L.)
Lagunaria patersonia subsp. patersonia (as H. patersonius Andrews)Kosteletzkya adoensis (Hochst. ex A. Rich.) Mast. (as H. adoensis Hochst. ex A.Rich.)Kosteletzkya pentacarpos (L.) Ledeb. (as H. pentacarpos L.)Kosteletzkya tubiflora (DC.) Blanch. & McVaugh (as H. tubiflorus DC.)Kosteletzkya virginica (L.) C.Presl ex A.Gray (as H. virginicus L.)Pavonia arabica Hochst. & Steud. ex Boiss. (as H. flavus Forssk.)Pavonia spinifex (L.) Cav. (as H. spinifex L.)Radyera farragei (F.Muell.) Fryxell & S.H.Hashmi (as H. farragei F.Muell.)Thespesia lampas (Cav.) Dalzell (as H. lampas Cav.)Thespesia populnea (L.) Sol. ex Corrêa (as H. populneoides Roxb. or H. populneus L.)

 Uses  

 Landscaping 
Many species are grown for their showy flowers or used as landscape shrubs, and are used to attract butterflies, bees, and hummingbirds.

Hibiscus is a very hardy, versatile plant and in tropical conditions it can enhance the beauty of any garden. Being versatile it adapts itself easily to balcony gardens in crammed urban spaces and can be easily grown in pots as a creeper or even in hanging pots. It is a perennial and flowers throughout the year. As it comes in a variety of colors, it's a plant which can add vibrancy to any garden.

The only infestation that gardeners need to be vigilant about is mealybugs. Mealybug infestations are easy to spot as they are clearly visible as a distinct white cottony infestation on buds, leaves or even stems. To protect the plant you need to trim away the infected part, spray with water, and apply an appropriate pesticide.

 Paper 
One species of Hibiscus, known as kenaf (Hibiscus cannabinus), is extensively used in paper-making.

Rope and construction
The inner bark of the sea hibiscus (Hibiscus tiliaceus), also called 'hau', is used in Polynesia for making rope, and the wood for making canoe floats. The ropes on the missionary ship Messenger of Peace were made of fibres from hibiscus trees.

 Beverage 

The tea made of the calyces of Hibiscus sabdariffa is known by many names in many countries around the world and is served both hot and cold. The beverage is well known for its red colour, tartness and unique flavour. Additionally, it is highly nutritious because of its vitamin C content.

It is known as bissap in West Africa, "Gul e Khatmi" in Urdu & Persian, agua de jamaica in Mexico and Central America (the flower being flor de jamaica) and Orhul in India. Some refer to it as roselle, a common name for the hibiscus flower. In Jamaica, Trinidad and many other islands in the Caribbean, the drink is known as sorrel (Hibiscus sabdariffa; not to be confused with Rumex acetosa, a species sharing the common name sorrel). In Ghana, the drink is known as soobolo in one of the local languages.

In Cambodia, a cold beverage can be prepared by first steeping the petals in hot water until the colors are leached from the petals, then adding lime juice (which turns the beverage from dark brown/red to a bright red), sweeteners (sugar/honey) and finally cold water/ice cubes.

In Egypt and Sudan, hibiscus tea is known as karkadé (كركديه), and is served as both a hot and a cold drink.

Hibiscus (also known in Sri Lanka as shoe flower, සපත්තු මල, වද මල in Sinhalese) is an ingredient with a rich heritage of refreshing Lankans. Fresh juices, ice teas and syrups made of the Hibiscus flower are famous refreshments among Sri Lankans.

 Food 
Dried hibiscus is edible, and it is often a delicacy in Mexico. It can also be candied and used as a garnish, usually for desserts.

The roselle (Hibiscus sabdariffa) is used as a vegetable.
The species Hibiscus suratensis Linn synonymous with Hibiscus aculeatus G. Don is noted in Visayas in the Philippines as being a souring ingredient for almost all local vegetables and menus. Known as labog in the Visayan area (or labuag/sapinit in Tagalog), the species is an ingredient in cooking native chicken soup.Hibiscus species are used as food plants by the larvae of some lepidopteran species, including Chionodes hibiscella, Hypercompe hambletoni, the nutmeg moth, and the turnip moth.

 Folk medicine Hibiscus rosa-sinensis is described as having a number of medical uses in Indian Ayurveda.

 Claimed effects on blood pressure 
It has been claimed that sour teas derived from Hibiscus sabdariffa may lower blood pressure.

 Precautions and contraindications 

 Pregnancy and lactation 
While the mechanism is not well understood, previous animal studies have demonstrated both an inhibitory effect of H. sabdariffa on muscle tone and the anti-fertility effects of Hibiscus rosa-sinensis, respectively. The extract of H. sabdariffa has been shown to stimulate contraction of the rat bladder and uterus; the H. rosa-sinensis extract has exhibited contraceptive effects in the form of estrogen activity in rats. These findings have not been observed in humans. The Hibiscus rosa-sinensis is also thought to have emmenagogue effects which can stimulate menstruation and, in some women, cause an abortion. Due to the documented adverse effects in animal studies and the reported pharmacological properties, the H. sabdariffa and H. rosa-sinensis are not recommended for use during pregnancy.

 Drug interactions 
It is postulated that H. sabdariffa interacts with diclofenac, chloroquine and acetaminophen by altering the pharmacokinetics. In healthy human volunteers, the H. sabdariffa extract was found to reduce the excretion of diclofenac upon co-administration. Additionally, co-administration of Karkade (H. sabdariffa), a common Sudanese beverage, was found to reduce chloroquine bioavailability. However, no statistically significant changes were observed in the pharmacokinetics of acetaminophen when administered with the Zobo (H. sabdariffa) drink. Further studies are needed to demonstrate clinical significance.

 Symbolism and culture    
The red hibiscus is the flower of the Hindu goddess Kali, and appears frequently in depictions of her in the art of Bengal, India, often with the goddess and the flower merging in form. The hibiscus is used as an offering to Kali and the god Ganesha in Hindu worship.

In the Philippines, the gumamela (the local name for hibiscus) is used by children as part of a bubble-making pastime. The flowers and leaves are crushed until the sticky juices come out. Hollow papaya stalks are then dipped into this and used as straws for blowing bubbles. Together with soap, hibiscus juices produce more bubbles. It is also called "Tarukanga" in Waray, particularly in Eastern Samar province.

The hibiscus flower is traditionally worn by Tahitian and Hawaiian girls. If the flower is worn behind the left ear, the woman is married or has a boyfriend. If the flower is worn on the right, she is single or openly available for a relationship. The yellow hibiscus is Hawaii's state flower.

Nigerian author Chimamanda Ngozi Adichie named her first novel Purple Hibiscus after the delicate flower.

The bark of the hibiscus contains strong bast fibres that can be obtained by letting the stripped bark set in the sea to let the organic material rot away.

 As a national and state symbol 
The hibiscus is a national symbol of Haiti, and the national flower of nations including the Solomon Islands and Niue. Hibiscus syriacus is the national flower of South Korea, and Hibiscus rosa-sinensis is the national flower of Malaysia. Hibiscus brackenridgei'' is the state flower of Hawaii.

References

External links

American Hibiscus Society (AHS)
Australian Hibiscus Society
International Hibiscus Society
Vicki J. Coldwell Plant and care Hibiscus
Foundation for Revitalisation of Local Health Traditions

 
Medicinal plants
Malvaceae genera
National symbols of Haiti
Taxa named by Carl Linnaeus
Flowers in religion
Articles containing video clips